Streptomyces youssoufiensi is a bacterium species from the genus of Streptomyces which has been isolated from a phosphate mine in Youssoufia in Morocco.

See also 
 List of Streptomyces species

References

Further reading

External links
Type strain of Streptomyces youssoufiensis at BacDive – the Bacterial Diversity Metadatabase

youssoufiensi
Bacteria described in 2011